Sideling Hill Wildlife Management Area is a Wildlife Management Area in Allegany and Washington County, Maryland. The area is named for Sideling Hill, where a spectacular manmade notch was cut to allow Interstate 68 to pass through.

External links
 Sideling Hill Wildlife Management Area

Wildlife management areas of Maryland
Protected areas of Allegany County, Maryland
Protected areas of Washington County, Maryland